Scyllarides herklotsii is a species of slipper lobster from the Atlantic coast West Africa. It is edible, but is not commercially fished, and is taken only by accident.

S. herklotsii was named in 1851 by Jan Adrian (or Janus Adrianus) Herklots in a doctoral thesis at the University of Leiden; the type material came from Butre, Ghana, and is stored at the Dutch . The species is found from Senegal, where its range overlaps slightly with that of Scyllarides latus, south to Ponta do Pinda, Angola. It prefers sandy and rocky substrates.

It may be differentiated from S. latus by the lower, more rounded nature of the tubercles on the carapace.

References

Achelata
Edible crustaceans
Crustaceans described in 1851